Aris Thessaloniki Women's Volleyball is the women's volleyball department of Aris Thessaloniki, the Greek multisport club based in Thessaloniki. The club plays in the A1 Ethniki Women's Volleyball. In 2015-2016 season is on the 4th place of the first category.

History
The women's team of Aris was founded in 1926. After some years the team ceased its activities. The club became again active since 1971. For a lot of years the club plays in A1 Ethniki. The presence of Aris in A1 Ethniki was interrupted for five years, between 1989 and 1993. The next period, the club returned in A1 Ethniki and plays continuously until 2009, when it was relegated again. The next return in A1 Ethniki was in current season. In 2014-15, Aris finished in 1st place of its group and promoted to A1.

Recent seasons

Honours

Domestic
 Greek Women’s Volleyball League:
Runners-up  : 2017-18

Current women's volleyball squad
As of October 5, 2016

Technical staff

References

External links
ARIS Women's volleyball Official website

Aris Thessaloniki
Aris V.C.
Greek volleyball clubs